Jonas van Genechten (born 16 September 1986) is a Belgian former professional road bicycle racer, who rode professionally between 2009 and 2021 for the  (2009–2010),  (2011),  (2012–2014),  (2015–2016),  (2017) and  (2018–2021) teams. During his professional career, he took eight victories, including the seventh stage at the 2016 Vuelta a España.

Major results
Source: 

2007
 1st Stage 1 Tour du Haut-Anjou
2008
 2nd Druivenkoers Overijse
 5th Grand Prix Criquielion
 6th Paris–Mantes-en-Yvelines
 8th Paris–Tours Espoirs
2009
 6th Ronde van Noord-Holland
 8th Kattekoers
 8th Memorial Van Coningsloo
2010
 3rd Grote Prijs Stad Zottegem
 4th Dwars door het Hageland
 7th Boucles de l'Aulne
 8th Grote Prijs Stad Geel
2011
 1st Kattekoers
 2nd Grote Prijs Stad Geel
 5th Kuurne–Brussels–Kuurne
 6th Schaal Sels
 7th De Vlaamse Pijl
 10th Flèche Ardennaise
 10th Nationale Sluitingsprijs
2012
 3rd Grand Prix Pino Cerami
2013
 1st Grand Prix Pino Cerami
 4th Druivenkoers Overijse
 10th Overall World Ports Classic
2014
 1st Grand Prix de Fourmies
 1st Druivenkoers Overijse
 1st Stage 4 Tour de Pologne
 2nd Grand Prix Pino Cerami
 3rd Kampioenschap van Vlaanderen
 3rd Nationale Sluitingsprijs
 4th Overall Tour de l'Eurométropole
 7th Binche–Chimay–Binche
2015
 1st Stage 4 Tour de Wallonie
 1st Stage 2 Tour de l'Eurométropole
 4th Binche–Chimay–Binche
 6th Grand Prix d'Isbergues
 8th Halle–Ingooigem
2016
 1st Stage 7 Vuelta a España
 3rd Paris–Tours
 6th Trofeo Felanitx–Ses Salines–Campos–Porreres
 6th Trofeo Playa de Palma
 9th Kuurne–Brussels–Kuurne
 9th Binche–Chimay–Binche
2017
 2nd Trofeo Felanitx–Ses Salines–Campos–Porreres
 6th Route Adélie
 10th Scheldeprijs
 10th Clásica de Almería
2018
 1st Omloop van het Houtland
 2nd Grote Prijs Jef Scherens
 6th Kampioenschap van Vlaanderen
 7th Binche–Chimay–Binche
2019
 6th Nokere Koerse
 7th Three Days of Bruges–De Panne

Grand Tour general classification results timeline

References

External links

Official Profile

1986 births
Living people
Belgian male cyclists
Cyclists from Hainaut (province)
People from Lobbes
Belgian Vuelta a España stage winners